Thimar is an album by the Tunisian oud player Anouar Brahem, recorded in 1997 and released on the ECM label.

Reception 
The AllMusic review by Raymond McKinney stated that it "superbly fuses the traditions of jazz with those of Arab classical music, pushing the parameters of both while succumbing to the clichés of neither".

Track listing

Personnel 
Anouar Brahem - oud
John Surman - soprano saxophone, bass clarinet
Dave Holland - double bass

References 

1998 albums
ECM Records albums
Anouar Brahem albums
Albums produced by Manfred Eicher